This article will list all fortifications that were built, partially built, or ordered to be built by the Portuguese throughout the globe. All forts in this list are outside the modern territory of Portugal, and were built for the purpose of colonialism and the Portuguese Empire.

Portuguese explorers have discovered many lands and the sea routes in the 15th-18th centuries during the Age of Discovery. Along the way they built outposts and fortresses, many of which still exist today all over the world. Similar in design they are often easy to recognize although not in Portuguese hands for many years or centuries already.

List of forts by region

Africa

Americas

Asia-Pacific

See also
 Architecture of Portugal

References

Notes

 
Portuguese colonial architecture